Cryptolechia temperata is a moth in the family Depressariidae. It was described by Edward Meyrick in 1910. It is found in the Himalayas in India.

The wingspan is 20–24 mm. The forewings are ochreous-yellow tinged with brownish towards the termen. The stigmata is brownish. The hindwings are light grey, tinged with pale ochreous.

References

Moths described in 1910
Cryptolechia (moth)
Taxa named by Edward Meyrick